Anaplusia pannosa is a moth of the family Noctuidae. It is found in India, including Sikkim, West Bengal, Darjiling and the Khasia Hills.

External links
Anaplusia at funet
Butterflies and moths of the world

Plusiinae
Moths of Asia